The Florida Library Association (FLA) is a regional, non-profit organization that promotes professional discourse and opportunities for the library community in Florida.  The FLA publishes the Florida Libraries Journal.

The organization's mission shares similar goals with the American Library Association (ALA), in that organization members promote adapting to the new information age. The Florida Library Association began meeting in 1906,  but it was officially formed in 1920 by Helen Virginia Stelle, director of the Tampa Public Library. In addition to its publication, Florida Libraries , the FLA provides a forum for issues and advocacy.

History
Prior to any formal organization, the first state-wide assembly of Florida librarians took place in December 1906 in St. Augustine. On April 26, 1920, the Florida Library Association was officially established. The institution started out with 23 charter members whose primary goal was to embolden the state government, to establish a state library agency, and to endorse legislation that allowed for counties to establish their own libraries within their own communities. They were successful in their efforts, and in 1925 the state library was established. In 1931 a county library law was sanctioned. The first chairman and then-president of the Florida Library Association was Helen Virginia Stelle. Each year since 1920, with the exception of 1943-1945 (due to WWII), the conference has taken place in various libraries throughout the state. This federation and assembly of Florida librarians have brought about progress in discourse, activism, and forward-thinking adaptations to the way libraries function throughout the state. Themes which over its history have informed the FLA assembly, its mission, and its activism include “The Enlightened South” in 1966, “Threshold of a New Decade” in 1969, libraries as a “Renewable Resource” in 1986, and “Diverse Libraries to Serve Floridians” in 2000. The 1935 Florida Library Survey statement demonstrates the FLA’s commitment to its mission by indicating that the organization “must take the lead to inform citizens of the desirability of library service to meet their practical and cultural needs.”

Advocacy
The FLA addresses important and impactful issues that affect Florida's libraries and intellectual freedom.  Its Statement on Professional Education states that Librarians and Library Directors must have a master's degree in Library and Information Sciences or Studies to uphold professional standards.  The Statement on Privatization of Supported Libraries advocates that efforts to privatize libraries by for-profit organizations should be opposed.

The FLA organizes an annual Library Legislative Day during which librarians, library advocates, and other supporters meet both virtually and in person at the Florida State Capitol in Tallahassee to speak with legislators in order to raise awareness of library issues.

Court cases
In 2006, the FLA filed an amicus curiae memorandum in the United States District Court in support of an ACLU and Miami-Dade Student Government Association lawsuit.  The Miami-Dade County School Board removed the book Vamos a Cuba and "A Visit to..." book series from the Miami-Dade School Board libraries and classrooms. In early 2009, the 11th Circuit Court of Appeals reversed the decision to return the book to the school libraries.

Censorship
The FLA supports the Florida Association for Media in Education (FAME) in their opposition to filed Florida legislation HB855 and SB1454, which has been criticized by the National Coalition Against Censorship for weakening First Amendment rights to freedom of speech by "authorizing any Florida resident (even if they have no connection to a particular school or library) to sue for injunctions to remove material they deem controversial and burden school districts with legal fees and court action."

Public awareness tools
The FLA works to show the benefits of Florida's libraries. On their website, the Association promotes several tools and information sources, including Return on Investment information, data to support advocacy messages, Access Studies, and recommended readings.

Friends of Florida Libraries Honor Roll
The Friends of Florida Libraries Honor Roll supports FLA advocacy activities within the state government.  Every year, the Friends of Florida Libraries sponsors a Library Day in Tallahassee in order to advocate for funding, library related legislation, and awareness.

Archives 

The Florida Library Association records are available for research at the University of South Florida Libraries Tampa Special Collections. The collection consists of 144 boxes of historical research material and institutional records, ranging from 1905 to 2015. Included in the repository are meeting minutes, treasurer's reports, conference programs, planning material, newspaper clippings, photographs, committee records, and other associated subject files. They were organized by Bernadette E. Storck, 1979-1980 FLA president.  The collection is available to affiliated University of South Florida researchers and the general public.

Awards
The FLA offers several awards for outstanding librarians, advocates, and leaders every year.  The awards include the following:
FLA Leader of the Year Award- Recognizes distinguished service.
Librarian of the Year Award- Recognizes outstanding contributions to the field.
 2006. Mary Jane Little, Director – St. Johns County Library
 2009. Doreen A. Gauthier, Lighthouse Point Library
 2010. Linda Allen, Pasco County Library System
 2011. Paul Clark, "The Library Guy" at Fleming Island branch library
 2012. Jim Morris. For strong leadership on the Task Force on the Future of Academic Libraries in Florida 
 2013. Carolynn Volz. Hodges University
 2014. Susan Dillinger. New Port Richey Public Library.
 2015. Ellen Schellhause. Director of the Maitland Public Library.
 2016. David Mather. Gulfport Public Library.
 2017. Ava Ehde, Manatee County Public Library
 2018. Tina Neville, University of South Florida St. Petersburg (USFSP)
2019. Kelvin Watson- "Innovative and Inclusive"- Broward County Public Library
2020. Andrew S. Breidenbaugh, Director, Tampa–Hillsborough County Public Library System.
Library of the Year Award- Recognizes outstanding service to the community.
Lifetime Achievement Award- Recognizes a long, distinguished record of professional achievements and accomplishments.
Outstanding Citizen Library Award- Recognizes a citizen who has advanced the stature of libraries within Florida.
Outstanding New Librarian Award - Recognizes a Florida librarian that is new to the profession and has made significant contributions to their library or librarianship.
Outstanding Paraprofessional: Recognizes a library professional or support staff member that has made significant contributions to libraries in Florida.
Friends, Foundations and Boards Outstanding Member Award- Recognizes a member of a library group for outstanding service.
Intellectual Freedom Award- Recognizes an individual or organization who made a contribution to right of access.
Web Site Awards: Public Library, Special or Academic Library, or Youth Services- To award "good design and usability in web page development."
Maria Chavez-Hernandez "Libraries Change Peoples' Lives" Award- Awards individuals or libraries with outreach programs for immigrant or underserved populations.
Exemplary Learning Design Award- Recognizes excellent classes, tutorial programs, or fact-finders in libraries.
Library Innovation Award- Awards libraries who use emerging technologies in an innovative manner.
Outstanding Business/Media Partner Award- To honor a supporter of Florida libraries.
Libraries Mean Business Award- "To recognize a library's contributions to the business community."
Betty Davis Miller Youth Services Award- Recognizes innovative or outstanding youth programs.

Scholarships 

The FLA offers multiple scholarships each year. In 2018-2019, there were three scholarships offered. There were 3 FLA MLS Graduate scholarships for $2,000 each. The first one was the Florida State University Scholarship that was for a student attending the Florida State University MSLIS graduate program. The second scholarship was the Bernadette Stork/University of South Florida Scholarship that was for a student who was attending the University of South Florida MLIS graduate program. The third scholarship was the Minority Scholarship, for an MLS graduate student attending either Florida State University or the University of South Florida.

List of presidents

References

External links
 Florida Library Association website
 Southeastern Library Association website

1906 establishments in Florida
1920 establishments in Florida
Organizations established in 1906
Organizations established in 1920
Library-related professional associations
Library Association